Lost in the Barrens is a children's novel by Farley Mowat, first published in 1956. Later editions used the title Two Against the North.

It won Governor General's Award in 1956 and the Canada Library Association Book of the Year for Children Award in 1958.

Plot introduction
Two Against the North is an adventure story that takes place in northern Manitoba and southwestern North West Territories in 1935. It tells a coming of age tale of two boys in their late teens, one a white boy who has recently lost his parents, the other a Cree boy from a tribe living nearby. The boys embark on a mission to relieve the starvation of a neighbouring village, occupied by the Chipewyans, but due to a series of unfortunate events become trapped above the tree line in Canada's northern Barren Lands during winter. The characters emerge again in Mowat's The Curse of the Viking Grave.

Plot summary
The parents of Jamie died in a car accident in Toronto in the year 1931, and four years later he is under the care of his trapper uncle, Angus Macnair, who lives in Manitoba. Angus has supported Jamie's boarding-school fees for a long time, until the fur trade begins to decline. Angus no longer supports Jamie's school, which is called Saint George's. Thus, Jamie leaves the boarding school to live with his uncle. Jamie makes friends with the Cree Tribe's Chief's son, Awasin. The Chief thinks a trader is cheating him, so he asks Angus and Jamie to go with him. It is eventually decided that Jamie has to stay in camp with Awasin because Angus' canoe could not hold three people as well as all of the gear. Soon after, a group of Chipewyans come to the Crees for help. The Chipewyans had been starving for days because they had not been able to shoot enough deer the summer before. Awasin's Uncle Soloman is suspicious that the Chipewyans may just be looking for a free handout, and so the boys agree to go with them back to the Chipewyan's camp to prove they need the supplies. Jamie wants to go, too, so the two and the Chipewyans who came (including Denikazi, their leader) canoe back to the Chipewyan camp. There, Denikazi has a misunderstanding that Jamie and Awasin are going with them on the hunt for the deer. This is how Jamie and Awasin start their journey for the deer hunt out in the barrens. Soon, they go up to the North farther, but they do not find any 'deer' (in the book, deer means barrenland caribou), so Denikazi orders Jamie and Awasin to stay with two young Chipewyans at a certain point until they come back. He includes that they should run, and forget about the camp if they encounter Inuit.

In this book, the Chipewyans and the Crees are deathly afraid of the Eskimos, who live in what some people have called "nothing but a God-forsaken place, the worst place on earth". Denikazi describes it this way: His people went and hunted as far north as they wanted to for deer, for they had guns and the Eskimos did not. Then, the Eskimos got guns and fought back. (Nowadays Eskimos are called 'Inuit' or 'Thule', but this was not the case when Mowat wrote his novel, or for decades afterward).  Anyway, while staying with the two young Chipewyan hunters, Jamie decides he wants to take the chance and explore. Awasin does not agree with his idea but later gives in. They go up to see the 'stone house' that one of the two Chipewyans had told them about. They try to find it but unexpectedly meet a whirlpool and barely survive. Gathering what they can salvage from the river and their broken canoe, they have minimal belongings. Since they cannot use the canoe anymore, they are stranded in the barrens. When the two young Chipewyans found out that Awasin and Jamie were gone, they went on searching for them. Their search is abruptly stopped when they catch a glance of an Eskimo kayak. As for Jamie and Awasin, they decide to go the way that Denikazi and the other hunters went, so they can join with them on the journey back. A problem occurs, for one of Denikazi's men sees what he believes is an Eskimo and they all flee quietly back.  They unknowingly pass by Jamie and Awasin's camp during the night.

Jamie and Awasin are then forced to overcome a series of obstacles including finding shelter and food and to wait until the summer when they can make the trek back to their home camp with the best chance of survival. They engage in a massive caribou hunt, and are able to build a log cabin and make a comfortable home for themselves. On their attempted return trip, they both become afflicted by snow blindness and were forced to stop the trip and heal up. Then, they decide to return to their cabin. Unfortunately, a blizzard hits and they are forced to seek shelter in an Eskimo igloo to survive. They are discovered by an Eskimo boy named Peetyuk who offers to help and takes them to his camp, where they learn that the Eskimo do not hate the Cree, and are only hostile because they are as afraid of the Cree as the Cree are of them. The boys are able to return home with the help of their new friends, and they make plans to return to their cabin the next summer with Jamie's uncle Angus.

Themes
Man vs. Nature: The true antagonist of this novel is Nature itself.  The boys struggle to survive in a very harsh, difficult environment.  The boys demonstrate true courage in hunting and even surviving an encounter with a grizzly bear.  They also show great ingenuity in doing so.  Awasin already has skills in hunting and fishing and also learns how to make warm clothes.  He is very clever as proven by how he is able to make a fire in chapter 9.  Meanwhile, Jamie is a very creative person.  He is the one who designs and builds first their stone igloo and later their wood cabin.  He is a 'think-outside-of-the-box' problem solver.  Working together they are successful.  This brings us to the next big theme

Intercultural Friendships: How do you overcome fear, ignorance and distrust between people from different cultures and backgrounds?  You work together and learn to trust one another.  That is how it is for Jamie and Awasin and then later between the two boys and Peetyuk.  Jamie is a white English speaking city boy from Toronto. Awasin is from the Cree camp in the wilderness.  He learns English while at boarding school.  The two very different boys become excellent friends.  Jamie helps Awasin to trust Peetyuk, even though the Cree have always been suspicious, fearful of them.

Coming of age: The novel is also a 'Coming of Age' story.  The two boys journey in the barrenlands is also their journey from boyhood towards manhood.  They are becoming men through their adventures and experiences, they are growing up.  For example, risk-taker Jamie learns some lessons about survival in the north through it all.  Also, Peetyuk, a secondary character, has reached an age where it is time to learn about his father's people after being raised by his mother and grandparents.

Adaptations
There is a 1990 television movie version of this novel, directed by Michael Scott.  It was made for a family/general audience so the hunting scenes are tame.  There are also quite a few differences between the movie and the novel.  Some plot differences between the novel and the movie are:
The movie is from Jamie's perspective (1st person) instead of the all-knowing 3rd person in the novel.
Jamie does not want to go north and, unlike the novel, dislikes the entire idea of living with his uncle.
The boys go hunting with Awasin's father Alphonse instead of Denikazi and the Chipewyans.

Some other changes include:
Awasin is called Awasis, Uncle Angus' last name is different.
Jamie and Awasin meet on a train instead of at Angus' cabin.
Alphonse is called Mewasin.
Uncle Angus says in the movie that he does not want Jamie with him.
Unlike the novel, Uncle Angus does not send for Jamie when fur prices drop, but rather Jamie is sent north by the school because Jamie's trust fund runs out.

It was shot in Winnipeg, Manitoba.

References

1956 Canadian novels
1956 children's books
Novels by Farley Mowat
Canadian children's novels
Novels set in Manitoba
Novels set in the Northwest Territories